A by-election for the seat of Katherine in the Northern Territory Legislative Assembly was held on 4 October 2003. The by-election was triggered by the resignation of Country Liberal Party (CLP) member Mike Reed, a former Deputy Chief Minister. The seat had been held by Reed since its creation in 1987.

The CLP selected Fay Miller, the owner of Red Gum Tourist Park, as its candidate. The Labor candidate was Sharon Hillen, while three independent candidates contested, including the mayor of Katherine, Jim Forscutt.

Results

References

2003 elections in Australia
Northern Territory by-elections
2000s in the Northern Territory